This is a list of baronetcies in the Baronetage of Great Britain. There were first created in 1707, and was replaced by the Baronetage of the United Kingdom in 1801.

A

B

C

D

E

F

G

H

I

J

K

L

M

N

O

P-Q

R

S

T

V

W

Y

See also
Baronetage of Great Britain
List of baronetcies in the Baronetage of Ireland
List of baronetcies in the Baronetage of Nova Scotia
List of baronetcies in the Baronetage of the United Kingdom
List of baronetcies in the Baronetage of England

References

External links
 Baronetcies to which no Succession has been proved

Great Britain